A French dip sandwich, also known as a beef dip, is a hot sandwich consisting of thinly sliced roast beef (or, sometimes, other meats) on a "French roll" or baguette. It is usually served plain but a variation is to top with Swiss cheese, onions, and a dipping container of beef broth produced from the cooking process (termed au jus, "with juice"). Beef stock, a light beef gravy, or beef consommé is sometimes substituted. The sandwich is an American invention, with the name seeming to refer to the style of bread, rather than any French origin. Although the sandwich is most commonly served with a cup of jus or broth on the side of the plate, into which the sandwich is dipped as it is eaten, this is not how the sandwich was served when it was invented.

Two Los Angeles restaurants have claimed to be the birthplace of the French dip sandwich: Cole's Pacific Electric Buffet and Philippe the Original. Philippe's website describes the dish as a "specialty of the house", and the words "Home of the Original French Dip Sandwich" are present in the restaurant's logo. At Phillippe's, the roll is dipped in the hot beef juices before the sandwich is assembled, and is served "wet", while at Cole's it is served with a side of beef juices. The sandwich can also be requested "double dipped", where both halves of the sandwich are dipped before serving, at either establishment. Both restaurants feature their own brand of spicy mustard that is traditionally used by patrons to complement the sandwich.

The controversy over who originated the sandwich remains unresolved. Both restaurants were established in 1908. However, Cole's claims to have originated the sandwich shortly after the restaurant opened in 1908, while Philippe's claims that owner Philippe Mathieu invented it in 1918.

The story of the sandwich's invention by Philippe's has several variants: some sources say that it was first created by a cook or a server who, while preparing a sandwich for a police officer or fireman, accidentally dropped it into a pan of meat drippings. The patron liked it, and the dish surged in popularity shortly after its invention. Other accounts say that a customer who didn't want some meat drippings to go to waste requested his sandwich be dipped in them. Still others say that a chef dipped a sandwich into a pan of meat drippings after a customer complained that the bread was stale. Cole's account states that the sandwich was invented by a sympathetic chef, Jack Garlinghouse, for a customer who was complaining of sore gums. Some accounts tell Philippe's version of events, but assign the location to Cole's. The mystery of the sandwich's invention might not be solved due to a lack of information and observable evidence.

The French dip is now served at a number of restaurant chains including fast food places, diners, and standard restaurants.

See also
 Beef on weck
 Cheesesteak 
 Italian beef, a similar sandwich which is dipped in the juices
 List of American sandwiches
 List of sandwiches
 Roast beef sandwich
 Steak sandwich

References

External links

 Philippe's the Original
 Philippe's on Sandwich Paradise on Travel Channel

American sandwiches
Culture of Los Angeles
Cuisine of the Western United States
French-American culture in California
Beef sandwiches
Hot sandwiches